Charlie James (9 February 1874 – 4 August 1948) was an Australian rules footballer who played with South Melbourne in the Victorian Football League (VFL).

Death
He died at Balwyn, Victoria on 4 August 1948.

Notes

References
 South Melbourne Team, Melbourne Punch, (Thursday, 4 June 1903), p.16. 
 Holmesby, Russell & Main, Jim (2014), The Encyclopedia of AFL Footballers: every AFL/VFL player since 1897 (10th ed.), Melbourne, Victoria: Bas Publishing.

External links 
 		
 

1874 births
1948 deaths
Australian rules footballers from Melbourne
Australian Rules footballers: place kick exponents
Sydney Swans players
People from Malvern, Victoria